The University of Žilina was established on 1 October 1953 as the College of Railways in Prague. In 1959, the institution changed its name to the University of Transport and moved to Žilina. As a result of the increasing role of communications within the curriculum and research orientation of the university, the name was amended to the University of Transport and Communications in 1980.

It was renamed again to the University of Žilina pursuant to the law passed by the Slovak National Council on 20 November 1996.

The University of Žilina is the only university located in the northwest region of the Slovak Republic. It provides education at all three levels of higher education both in full-time and part-time forms (Bachelor's degree, Engineer/Master's degree and Doctoral degree). All the university's faculties provide a supplementary course of pedagogical studies for students and graduates.

Over the last 57 years, more than 52,000 students have graduated from the university; 1662 of them have been awarded the Ph.D. degree.

The university has established contacts with many universities abroad. Professors and research workers at the university participate in international educational and research projects. These include the European Union projects TEMPUS, COPERNICUS, COST, LLP/ERASMUS, Leonardo da Vinci, than CEEPUS, National Scholarship Programme, DAAD. The academic staff are involved in cooperation within the EU's 6th and 7th Framework programmes.

Faculties
 Faculty of Civil Engineering
 Faculty of Electrical Engineering
 Faculty of Management Science & Informatics
 Faculty of Mechanical Engineering
 Faculty of Humanities
 Faculty of Operation and Economics of Transport and Communications
 Faculty of Security Engineering

Institutes and Centers
 Institute of Forensic Engineering
 Institute of Information and Communication Technologies
 Institute of Foreign Languages
 Institute of Physical Education
 CETRA Centre of Transport Research
 Institute of Continuing Education
 Institute of Competitiveness and Innovations
 Institute of High Mountain Biology
 Aviation Training and Educational Centre
 Centre for further Education of Teachers

References

External links
 Official Website

Faculties

 Faculty of Civil Engineering
 Faculty of Management Science
 Faculty of Humanities
 Faculty of Economics of Transport

Zilina
Žilina
Buildings and structures in Žilina